Allen County Courthouse may refer to:

Allen County Courthouse (Indiana), Fort Wayne, Indiana
Allen County Courthouse (Kansas), Iola, Kansas
Allen County Courthouse (Ohio), Lima, Ohio

See also
Allen Parish Courthouse, Oberlin, Louisiana